George Coles (1884–1963) was an English architect, known mostly as a designer of Art Deco cinema theatres in the 1920s and 1930s.

Coles was brought up in Leyton, East London and trained at Leyton Technical Institute. From 1912 he was in partnership with Percy Adams. Cole's most notable works include Troxy in Stepney, the Gaumont State Cinema in Kilburn and the Odeon, Muswell Hill, all of which are Grade II* listed buildings.

Cole designed several other Odeon Cinemas for Oscar Deutsch, as well as the Carlton Cinema in Islington, and the Regal Cinema in Kettering. He designed the Kingsland Empire in his birthplace, Dalston, of which the ceiling and upper walls survive hidden above the Rio Cinema. Coles was also involved in the design of The People's Palace (1936) later subsumed into Queen Mary College, University of London. He designed the British Home Stores (now Primark) in Rye Lane, Peckham.

References

1884 births
1963 deaths
People from Leyton
20th-century English architects
Art Deco architects
Architects from London